John B. Myers House and Barn in Florissant, Missouri is listed on the National Register of Historic Places in Missouri.  The house, a Classical Revival building built in 1878, was listed in 1974 as John B. Myers House.  The listing name and boundary were increased to include the barn, built in 1867, in 1977.

The property was up for auction in 2015.

References

Houses on the National Register of Historic Places in Missouri
Neoclassical architecture in Missouri
Houses completed in 1867
Houses completed in 1878
Houses in St. Louis County, Missouri
National Register of Historic Places in St. Louis County, Missouri
1974 establishments in Missouri
Buildings and structures in St. Louis County, Missouri